Filippo Walter Ratti (1914–1981) was an Italian screenwriter and film director. After working as an assistant director for several years, he made his directoral debut in 1946. The following year he directed the biopic Eleonora Duse. In 1962 he directed Ten Italians for One German, a portrayal of the 1944 Ardeatine massacre in Rome.

Selected filmography

Director
 Eleonora Duse (1947)
 The Black Mask (1952)
 It's Never Too Late (1953)
 Ten Italians for One German (1962)
 Erika (1971)
La notte dei dannati (1971)
 Crazy Desires of a Murderer (1977)

References

Bibliography 
 Gordon, Robert. The Holocaust in Italian Culture, 1944–2010. Stanford University Press, 2012.

External links 
 

1914 births
1981 deaths
20th-century Italian screenwriters
Italian male screenwriters
Italian film directors
Writers from Rome
20th-century Italian male writers